Eucalyptus tenera, commonly known as the glazed mallee or sand mallee, is a species of mallee that is endemic to Western Australia. It has smooth bark, narrow lance-shaped to elliptical leaves, flower buds in groups of seven to eleven, lemon yellow flowers and cup-shaped to barrel-shaped fruit.

Description
It has smooth greyish to brownish bark. Flowering has been recorded in November and the flowers are lemon yellow.

Taxonomy and naming
Eucalyptus tenera was first formally described in 1992 by Lawrie Johnson and Ken Hill from specimens collected by Ian Brooker near Bencubbin in 1984. The specific epithet (tenera) is from the Latin tener meaning "delicate", in comparison to the related E. eremophila and E. tephroclada.

Distribution and habitat
Glazed mallee occurs over a wide are of the western and northern wheatbelt between Coorow, Chiddarcooping Rock and Lake King. It grows with other mallee species in wandoo woodland.

Conservation status
This eucalypt is classified as "not threatened" by the Western Australian Government Department of Parks and Wildlife.

See also
List of Eucalyptus species

References

Eucalypts of Western Australia
tenera
Myrtales of Australia
Mallees (habit)
Plants described in 1992
Taxa named by Lawrence Alexander Sidney Johnson
Taxa named by Ken Hill (botanist)